Joe Pearce may refer to:
 Joe Pearce (Australian rugby league) (1910–1995), Australian rugby league player
 Joe Pearce (British rugby league) (fl. 1925–c. 1933), British rugby league player
 Joe Pearce (footballer) (1885–1915), Australian rules footballer

See also
 Joseph Pearce (disambiguation)